OneFootball is a platform-based football media company. The OneFootball app features live-scores, statistics and news from 200 leagues in 12 different languages covered by a newsroom located in Berlin. In 2019, OneFootball partnered up with Eleven Sports to have the rights to stream directly on the app La Liga in UK and with Sky to transmit 2. Bundesliga and DFB-Pokal matches in Germany. In 2020, OneFootball bought club-founded video forum Dugout. Speaking of the deal to Bloomberg, OneFootball CEO Lucas von Cranach said that the move will " might benefit the whole football ecosystem with clubs, federations and leagues able to increase audience reach and harness our powerful data insights to gain a deeper understanding of their fans' engagement as the rise of advertising means they need to know as much as possible ".

History 
The company was founded under the name Motain by Lucas Von Cranach in 2013. In 2009, Von Cranach launched iLiga (THE football app abroad). Following a move to the new HQ in Berlin, Motain and its products (iLiga and THE football app) were merged under the name of OneFootball. On 7 September 2016 OneFootball was featured in the Apple keynote in San Francisco for the release of watchOS 3. The management team, which included Silke Kuisle as CFO, expanded in 2018 with the arrival of the ex-Puma CEO, Franz Koch, as the new COO and the SPORT1MEDIA ex-CEO Patrick Fischer, as the new CBO. On 15 December 2020, the company took over Dugout, a multimedia forum founded by a host of Europe's biggest clubs, for reportedly more than $61 million. In May 2022 OneFootball raised €300 million in a series D financing round led by Liberty City Ventures and included participation from Animoca Brands, Dapper Labs, DAH Beteiligungs GmbH, Quiet Capital, RIT Capital Partners, Senator Investment Group and Alsara Investment Group.

OneFootball broadcasting rights

OneFootball partnerships

References

External links
 International edition (English)
 International edition (Spanish)
 International edition (French)
 German edition
 Italian edition
 Brazilian edition
 Indonesian edition

Internet properties established in 2008
German websites
Companies based in Berlin